Herne Hill is a suburb of Perth, Western Australia within the City of Swan local government area. The area has several wineries that make the Swan Valley popular for its wine production.

Wineries 

Carilley Estate, Highway Wines, Talijancich Wines, 
Valley Wines, Romato Wines, 
Windy Creek Estate.

Community facilities 
Minh Quang Meditation Institute, a Vietnamese Buddhist temple is located in the suburb.

Schools 

Herne Hill Primary School

References

Suburbs of Perth, Western Australia
Suburbs and localities in the City of Swan